Down Drury Lane to Memory Lane was the fourth hit album, and first UK number one, for German orchestra 101 Strings. The album was the twentieth record to make number one in the UK and the first double number one album. It spent five weeks at the top.

The album consists of orchestral cover versions of both older and contemporary hits.

Track listing

Chart positions

Writing credits
The following personnel all have writing credits on this album.

Rudolf Friml
Sigmund Romberg
Jerome Kern
Franz Lehár
Ivor Novello
Robert Stolz
Paul Abraham
Oscar Hammerstein II
Kenneth Leslie-Smith
Rodgers and Hammerstein
Harold Rome
Frederick Loewe
Alan Jay Lerner

References

1960 albums
101 Strings albums
Covers albums
Pye Golden Guinea Records albums
Instrumental albums